The pterygoid fossa is an anatomical term for the fossa formed by the divergence of the lateral pterygoid plate and the medial pterygoid plate of the sphenoid bone.

Structure
The lateral and medial pterygoid plates (of the pterygoid process of the sphenoid bone) diverge behind and enclose between them a V-shaped fossa, the pterygoid fossa.  This fossa faces posteriorly, and contains the medial pterygoid muscle and the tensor veli palatini muscle.

See also
 Pterygoid fovea
 Scaphoid fossa
 Pterygoid process

References 

Bones of the head and neck